The year 1765 in science and technology involved some significant events.

Astronomy
 February 8 – Nevil Maskelyne becomes Astronomer Royal in England.

Technology
 May – James Watt makes a breakthrough in the development of the steam engine by constructing a model with a separate condenser.
 October 15 – Gribeauval system for manufacture of cannon introduced in France by royal decree.
 Timișoara Fortress construction completed by the Habsburg Empire.

Zoology
 Saverio Manetti begins publication of his Storia naturale degli uccelli, trattata con metodo e adornata di figure intagliate in rame e miniate al naturale. Ornithologia methodice digesta atque iconibus aeneis ad vivum illuminatis ornate ("Natural History of the Birds, treated systematically and adorned with copperplate engraving illustrations, in miniature and life-size") in Florence.

Awards
 Copley Medal: Not awarded

Births
 March 7 – Nicéphore Niépce, French inventor (died 1833)
 November 14 – Robert Fulton, American engineer (died 1815)
 December 8 – Eli Whitney, American inventor (died 1825)

Deaths
 April 15 – Mikhail Lomonosov, Russian scientist (born 1711)
 May 7 – Alexis Clairaut, French mathematician (born 1713)
 September – Richard Pococke, English anthropologist and explorer (born 1704)
 December 25 – Václav Prokop Diviš, Czech theologian, natural scientist and pioneer in the field of electricity (born 1698)

References

 
18th century in science
1760s in science